Sergey, or Sergei Aslanyan may refer to:

Sergei Aslanyan (journalist) (born 1963), Russian journalist
Sergey Aslanyan (entrepreneur) (born 1973), Russian entrepreneur